Foster's Castle is a historic plantation house located near Tunstall, New Kent County, Virginia.  It was built about 1685, as a -story, T-shaped brick building, with a two-story central projection at the front. The house is similar to neighboring Criss Cross. It was raised to a full two stories with a low pitched roof in 1873. Its builder, Colonel Joseph Foster, was a vestryman and supervisor of construction at St. Peter's Church.

It was listed on the National Register of Historic Places in 1973.

References

External links
Castle, State Route 608 vicinity, Tunstall, New Kent County, VA 6 photos, 13 measured drawings, and 5 data pages at Historic American Buildings Survey

Historic American Buildings Survey in Virginia
Houses completed in 1685
Houses in New Kent County, Virginia
Plantation houses in Virginia
Houses on the National Register of Historic Places in Virginia
National Register of Historic Places in New Kent County, Virginia
1685 establishments in Virginia